The 1939 UCLA Bruins football team was an American football team that represented the University of California, Los Angeles during the 1939 college football season.  In their first year under head coach Edwin C. Horrell, the Bruins compiled a 6–0–4 record (5–0–3 conference), finished in second place in the Pacific Coast Conference, played #3-ranked USC to a scoreless tie, and were ranked #7 in the final AP Poll. Jackie Robinson, who is better known for breaking the color barrier in pro baseball, was a running back on the team.

Schedule

References

UCLA
UCLA Bruins football seasons
College football undefeated seasons
UCLA Bruins football